Coaña (Galician-Asturian: Cuaña) is a municipality in the Autonomous Community of the Principality of Asturias, Spain. It lies along the Cantabrian Sea to the north, and is bordered on the south by Boal, on the east by Navia and Villayón across the Navia River, and on the west by El Franco.

History
As the municipality of Obispalía, it formed part of the extensive territory of Navia – Eo, which was given to the Bishop of Oviedo by Alfonso VII in 1154 under the name Castropol.

In 1581, Coaña became an independent municipality, when the inhabitants purchased it from Philip II, the owner of Castropol by papal bull.

The municipality suffered during the invasion of French troops during the Peninsular War, and the villages of Coaña, Folgueras and Mohías were plundered.

Parish
Cartavio
Coaña
Folgueras
Lebredo
Mohías
Trelles
Villacondide

See also
Ortiguera

References

External links
Federación Asturiana de Concejos 
Guía del Occidente. Coaña 
El Espín 

Municipalities in Asturias